Mass media refers to a diverse array of media that reach a large audience via mass communication.

Broadcast media transmit information electronically via media such as films, radio, recorded music, or television. Digital media comprises both Internet and mobile mass communication. Internet media comprise such services as email, social media sites, websites, and Internet-based radio and television. Many other mass media outlets have an additional presence on the web, by such means as linking to or running TV ads online, or distributing QR codes in outdoor or print media to direct mobile users to a website. In this way, they can use the easy accessibility and outreach capabilities the Internet affords, as thereby easily broadcast information throughout many different regions of the world simultaneously and cost-efficiently. Outdoor media transmit information via such media as AR advertising; billboards; blimps; flying billboards (signs in tow of airplanes); placards or kiosks placed inside and outside buses, commercial buildings, shops, sports stadiums, subway cars, or trains; signs; or skywriting. Print media transmit information via physical objects, such as books, comics, magazines, newspapers, or pamphlets. Event organising and public speaking can also be considered forms of mass media.

The organisations that control these technologies, such as movie studios, publishing companies, and radio and television stations, are also known as the mass media.

Issues with definition 

In the late 20th century, mass media could be classified into eight mass media industries: books, the Internet, magazines, movies, newspapers, radio, recordings and television. The explosion of digital communication technology in the late 20th and early 21st centuries made prominent the question: what forms of media should be classified as "mass media"? For example, it is controversial whether to include mobile phones, computer games (such as MMORPGs) and video games in the definition. In the early 2000s, a classification called the "seven mass media" came into use. In order of introduction, they are:

 Print (books, pamphlets, newspapers, magazines, posters, etc.) from the late 15th century
 Recordings (gramophone records, magnetic tapes, cassettes, cartridges, CDs and DVDs) from the late 19th century
 Cinema from about 1900
 Radio from about 1910
 Television from about 1950
 Internet from about 1990
 Mobile phones from about 2000

Each mass medium has its own content types, creative artists, technicians and business models. For example, the Internet includes blogs, podcasts, web sites and various other technologies built atop the general distribution network. The sixth and seventh media, Internet and mobile phones, are often referred to collectively as digital media; and the fourth and fifth, radio and TV, as broadcast media. Some argue that video games have developed into a distinct mass form of media.

While a telephone is a two-way communication device, mass media communicates to a large group. In addition, the telephone has transformed into a cell phone which is equipped with Internet access. A question arises whether this makes cell phones a mass medium or simply a device used to access a mass medium (the Internet). There is currently a system by which marketers and advertisers are able to tap into satellites, and broadcast commercials and advertisements directly to cell phones, unsolicited by the phone's user. This transmission of mass advertising to millions of people is another form of mass communication.

Video games may also be evolving into a mass medium. Video games (for example, massively multiplayer online role-playing games (MMORPGs), such as RuneScape) provide a common gaming experience to millions of users across the globe and convey the same messages and ideologies to all their users. Users sometimes share the experience with one another by playing online. Excluding the Internet, however, it is questionable whether players of video games are sharing a common experience when they play the game individually. It is possible to discuss in great detail the events of a video game with a friend one has never played with, because the experience is identical to each. The question, then, is whether this is a form of mass communication.

Characteristics 

Five characteristics of mass communication have been identified by sociologist John Thompson of Cambridge University:
 "[C]omprises both technical and institutional methods of production and distribution" – This is evident throughout the history of mass media, from print to the Internet, each suitable for commercial utility
 Involves the "commodification of symbolic forms" – as the production of materials relies on its ability to manufacture and sell large quantities of the work; as radio stations rely on their time sold to advertisements, so too newspapers rely on their space for the same reasons
 "[S]eparate contexts between the production and reception of information"
 Its "reach to those 'far removed' in time and space, in comparison to the producers"
 "[I]nformation distribution" – a "one to many" form of communication, whereby products are mass-produced and disseminated to a great quantity of audiences

Mass vs. mainstream and alternative 

The term "mass media" is sometimes erroneously used as a synonym for "mainstream media". Mainstream media are distinguished from alternative media by their content and point of view. Alternative media are also "mass media" outlets in the sense that they use technology capable of reaching many people, even if the audience is often smaller than the mainstream.

In common usage, the term "mass" denotes not that a given number of individuals receives the products, but rather that the products are available in principle to a plurality of recipients.

Forms of mass media

Broadcast 

The sequencing of content in a broadcast is called a schedule. With all technological endeavours a number of technical terms and slang have developed.

Radio and television programs are distributed over frequency bands which are highly regulated in the United States. Such regulation includes determination of the width of the bands, range, licensing, types of receivers and transmitters used, and acceptable content.

Cable television programs are often broadcast simultaneously with radio and television programs, but have a more limited audience. By coding signals and requiring a cable converter box at individual recipients' locations, cable also enables subscription-based channels and pay-per-view services.

A broadcasting organisation may broadcast several programs simultaneously, through several channels (frequencies), for example BBC One and Two. On the other hand, two or more organisations may share a channel and each use it during a fixed part of the day, such as the Cartoon Network/Adult Swim. Digital radio and digital television may also transmit multiplexed programming, with several channels compressed into one ensemble.

When broadcasting is done via the Internet the term webcasting is often used. In 2004, a new phenomenon occurred when a number of technologies combined to produce podcasting. Podcasting is an asynchronous broadcast/narrowcast medium. Adam Curry and his associates, the Podshow, are principal proponents of podcasting.

Film 

The term 'film' encompasses motion pictures as individual projects, as well as the field in general. The name comes from the photographic film (also called film stock), historically the primary medium for recording and displaying motion pictures. Many other terms for film exist, such as motion pictures (or just pictures and "picture"), the silver screen, photoplays, the cinema, picture shows, flicks and, most commonly, movies.

Films are produced by recording people and objects with cameras, or by creating them using animation techniques or special effects. Films comprise a series of individual frames, but when these images are shown in rapid succession, an illusion of motion is created. Flickering between frames is not seen because of an effect known as persistence of vision, whereby the eye retains a visual image for a fraction of a second after the source has been removed. Also of relevance is what causes the perception of motion: a psychological effect identified as beta movement.

Film has emerged as an important art form. They entertain, educate, enlighten and inspire audiences. Any film can become a worldwide attraction, especially with the addition of dubbing or subtitles that translate the original language.

Video games 

A video game is a computer-controlled game in which a video display, such as a monitor or television set, is the primary feedback device. The term "computer game" also includes games which display only text or which use other methods, such as sound or vibration, as their primary feedback device. There always must also be some sort of input device, usually in the form of button/joystick combinations (on arcade games), a keyboard and mouse/trackball combination (computer games), a controller (console games), or a combination of any of the above. Also, more esoteric devices have been used for input, e.g., the player's motion. Usually there are rules and goals, but in more open-ended games the player may be free to do whatever they like within the confines of the virtual universe.

In common usage, an "arcade game" refers to a game designed to be played in an establishment in which patrons pay to play on a per-use basis. A "computer game" or "PC game" refers to a game that is played on a personal computer. A "Console game" refers to one that is played on a device specifically designed for the use of such, while interfacing with a standard television set. A "video game" (or "videogame") has evolved into a catchall phrase that encompasses the aforementioned along with any game made for any other device, including, but not limited to, advanced calculators, mobile phones, PDAs, etc.

Audio recording and reproduction 

Sound recording and reproduction is the electrical or mechanical re-creation or amplification of sound, often as music. This involves the use of audio equipment such as microphones, recording devices and loudspeakers. From early beginnings with the invention of the phonograph using purely mechanical techniques, the field has advanced with the invention of electrical recording, the mass production of the 78 record, the magnetic wire recorder followed by the tape recorder, the vinyl LP record. The invention of the compact cassette in the 1960s, followed by Sony's Walkman, gave a major boost to the mass distribution of music recordings, and the invention of digital recording and the compact disc in 1983 brought massive improvements in ruggedness and quality. The most recent developments have been in digital audio players.

An album is a collection of related audio recordings, released together to the public, usually commercially.

The term record album originated from the fact that 78 RPM phonograph disc records were kept together in a book resembling a photo album. The first collection of records to be called an "album" was Tchaikovsky's Nutcracker Suite, release in April 1909 as a four-disc set by Odeon Records. It retailed for 16 shillings—about £15 in modern currency.

A music video (also promo) is a short film or video that accompanies a complete piece of music, most commonly a song. Modern music videos were primarily made and used as a marketing device intended to promote the sale of music recordings. Although the origins of music videos go back much further, they came into their own in the 1980s, when Music Television's format was based on them. In the 1980s, the term "rock video" was often used to describe this form of entertainment, although the term has fallen into disuse.

Music videos can accommodate all styles of filmmaking, including animation, live-action films, documentaries, and non-narrative, abstract film.

Internet 

The Internet (also known simply as "the Net" or less precisely as "the Web") is a more interactive medium of mass media, and can be briefly described as "a network of networks". Specifically, it is the worldwide, publicly accessible network of interconnected computer networks that transmit data by packet switching using the standard Internet Protocol (IP). It consists of millions of smaller domestic, academic, business and governmental networks, which together carry various information and services, such as email, online chat, file transfer, and the interlinked web pages and other documents of the World Wide Web.

Contrary to some common usage, the Internet and the World Wide Web are not synonymous: the Internet is the system of interconnected computer networks, linked by copper wires, fibre-optic cables, wireless connections etc.; the Web is the contents, or the interconnected documents, linked by hyperlinks and URLs. The World Wide Web is accessible through the Internet, along with many other services including e-mail, file sharing and others described below.

Toward the end of the 20th century, the advent of the World Wide Web marked the first era in which most individuals could have a means of exposure on a scale comparable to that of mass media. Anyone with a web site has the potential to address a global audience, although serving to high levels of web traffic is still relatively expensive. It is possible that the rise of peer-to-peer technologies may have begun the process of making the cost of bandwidth manageable. Although a vast amount of information, imagery, and commentary (i.e. "content") has been made available, it is often difficult to determine the authenticity and reliability of information contained in web pages (in many cases, self-published). The invention of the Internet has also allowed breaking news stories to reach around the globe within minutes. This rapid growth of instantaneous, decentralised communication is often deemed likely to change mass media and its relationship to society.

"Cross-media" means the idea of distributing the same message through different media channels. A similar idea is expressed in the news industry as "convergence". Many authors understand cross-media publishing to be the ability to publish in both print and on the web without manual conversion effort. An increasing number of wireless devices with mutually incompatible data and screen formats make it even more difficult to achieve the objective "create once, publish many".

The Internet is quickly becoming the center of mass media. Everything is becoming accessible via the internet. Rather than picking up a newspaper, or watching the 10 o'clock news, people can log onto the internet to get the news they want, when they want it. For example, many workers listen to the radio through the Internet while sitting at their desk.

Even the education system relies on the Internet. Teachers can contact the entire class by sending one e-mail. They may have web pages on which students can get another copy of the class outline or assignments. Some classes have class blogs in which students are required to post weekly, with students graded on their contributions.

Blogs (web logs) 

Blogging, too, has become a pervasive form of media. A blog is a website, usually maintained by an individual, with regular entries of commentary, descriptions of events, or interactive media such as images or video. Entries are commonly displayed in reverse chronological order, with most recent posts shown on top. Many blogs provide commentary or news on a particular subject; others function as more personal online diaries. A typical blog combines text, images and other graphics, and links to other blogs, web pages, and related media. The ability for readers to leave comments in an interactive format is an important part of many blogs. Most blogs are primarily textual, although some focus on art (artlog), photographs (photoblog), sketchblog, videos (vlog), music (MP3 blog) and audio (podcasting), are part of a wider network of social media. Microblogging is another type of blogging which consists of blogs with very short posts.

RSS feeds 

RSS is a format for syndicating news and the content of news-like sites, including major news sites like Wired, news-oriented community sites like Slashdot, and personal blogs. It is a family of Web feed formats used to publish frequently updated content such as blog entries, news headlines, and podcasts. An RSS document (which is called a "feed" or "web feed" or "channel") contains either a summary of content from an associated web site or the full text. RSS makes it possible for people to keep up with web sites in an automated manner that can be piped into special programs or filtered displays.

Podcast 

A podcast is a series of digital-media files which are distributed over the Internet using syndication feeds for playback on portable media players and computers. The term podcast, like broadcast, can refer either to the series of content itself or to the method by which it is syndicated; the latter is also called podcasting. The host or author of a podcast is often called a podcaster.

Mobile 

Mobile phones were introduced in Japan in 1979 but became a mass media only in 1998 when the first downloadable ringing tones were introduced in Finland. Soon most forms of media content were introduced on mobile phones, tablets and other portable devices, and today the total value of media consumed on mobile vastly exceeds that of internet content, and was worth over $31 billion in 2007 (source Informa). The mobile media content includes over $8 billion worth of mobile music (ringing tones, ringback tones, truetones, MP3 files, karaoke, music videos, music streaming services etc.); over $5 billion worth of mobile gaming; and various news, entertainment and advertising services. In Japan mobile phone books are so popular that five of the ten best-selling printed books were originally released as mobile phone books.

Similar to the internet, mobile is also an interactive media, but has far wider reach, with 3.3 billion mobile phone users at the end of 2007 to 1.3 billion internet users (source ITU). Like email on the internet, the top application on mobile is also a personal messaging service, but SMS text messaging is used by over 2.4 billion people. Practically all internet services and applications exist or have similar cousins on mobile, from search to multiplayer games to virtual worlds to blogs. Mobile has several unique benefits which many mobile media pundits claim make mobile a more powerful media than either TV or the internet, starting with mobile being permanently carried and always connected. Mobile has the best audience accuracy and is the only mass media with a built-in payment channel available to every user without any credit cards or PayPal accounts or even an age limit. Mobile is often called the 7th Mass Medium and either the fourth screen (if counting cinema, TV and PC screens) or the third screen (counting only TV and PC).

Print media

Magazine 

A magazine is a periodical publication containing a variety of articles, generally financed by advertising or purchase by readers.

Magazines are typically published weekly, biweekly, monthly, bimonthly or quarterly, with a date on the cover that is in advance of the date it is actually published. They are often printed in color on coated paper, and are bound with a soft cover.

Magazines fall into two broad categories: consumer magazines and business magazines. In practice, magazines are a subset of periodicals, distinct from those periodicals produced by scientific, artistic, academic or special interest publishers which are subscription-only, more expensive, narrowly limited in circulation, and often have little or no advertising.

Magazines can be classified as:
 General interest magazines (e.g. Frontline, India Today, The Week, The Sunday Times etc.)
 Special interest magazines (women's, sports, business, scuba diving, etc.)

Newspaper 
A newspaper is a publication containing news and information and advertising, usually printed on low-cost paper called newsprint. It may be general or special interest, most often published daily or weekly. The most important function of newspapers is to inform the public of significant events. Local newspapers inform local communities and include advertisements from local businesses and services, while national newspapers tend to focus on a theme, which can be exampled with The Wall Street Journal as they offer news on finance and business related-topics. The first printed newspaper was published in 1605, and the form has thrived even in the face of competition from technologies such as radio and television. Recent developments on the Internet are posing major threats to its business model, however. Paid circulation is declining in most countries, and advertising revenue, which makes up the bulk of a newspaper's income, is shifting from print to online; some commentators, nevertheless, point out that historically new media such as radio and television did not entirely supplant existing.

The internet has challenged the press as an alternative source of information and opinion but has also provided a new platform for newspaper organisations to reach new audiences. According to the World Trends Report, between 2012 and 2016, print newspaper circulation continued to fall in almost all regions, with the exception of Asia and the Pacific, where the dramatic increase in sales in a few select countries has offset falls in historically strong Asian markets such as Japan and the Republic of Korea. Most notably, between 2012 and 2016, India's print circulation grew by 89 per cent.

Outdoor media 

Outdoor media is a form of mass media which comprises billboards, signs, placards placed inside and outside commercial buildings/objects like shops/buses, flying billboards (signs in tow of airplanes), blimps, skywriting, AR advertising. Many commercial advertisers use this form of mass media when advertising in sports stadiums. Tobacco and alcohol manufacturers used billboards and other outdoor media extensively. However, in 1998, the Master Settlement Agreement between the US and the tobacco industries prohibited the billboard advertising of cigarettes. In a 1994 Chicago-based study, Diana Hackbarth and her colleagues revealed how tobacco- and alcohol-based billboards were concentrated in poor neighbourhoods. In other urban centers, alcohol and tobacco billboards were much more concentrated in African-American neighbourhoods than in white neighbourhoods.

Purposes 
Mass media encompasses much more than just news, although it is sometimes misunderstood in this way. It can be used for various purposes:
 Advocacy, both for business and social concerns. This can include advertising, marketing, propaganda, public relations and political communication.
 Entertainment, traditionally through performances of acting, music and TV shows along with light reading; since the late 20th century also through video and computer games.
 Public service announcements and emergency alerts (that can be used as political device to communicate propaganda to the public).

Professions involving mass media

Journalism 

Journalism is the discipline of collecting, analyzing, verifying and presenting information regarding current events, trends, issues and people. Those who practice journalism are known as journalists.

News-oriented journalism is sometimes described as the "first rough draft of history" (attributed to Phil Graham), because journalists often record important events, producing news articles on short deadlines. While under pressure to be first with their stories, news media organisations usually edit and proofread their reports prior to publication, adhering to each organisation's standards of accuracy, quality and style. Many news organisation claim proud traditions of holding government officials and institutions accountable to the public, while media critics have raised questions about holding the press itself accountable to the standards of professional journalism.

Public relations 

Public relations is the art and science of managing communication between an organisation and its key publics to build, manage and sustain its positive image. Examples include:
 Corporations use marketing public relations to convey information about the products they manufacture or services they provide to potential customers to support their direct sales efforts. Typically, they support sales in the short and long term, establishing and burnishing the corporation's branding for a strong, ongoing market.
 Corporations also use public relations as a vehicle to reach legislators and other politicians, seeking favorable tax, regulatory, and other treatment, and they may use public relations to portray themselves as enlightened employers, in support of human-resources recruiting programs.
 Nonprofit organisations, including schools and universities, hospitals, and human and social service agencies, use public relations in support of awareness programs, fund-raising programs, staff recruiting, and to increase patronage of their services.
 Politicians use public relations to attract votes and raise money, and when successful at the ballot box, to promote and defend their service in office, with an eye to the next election or, at career's end, to their legacy.

Publishing 
 Publishing is the industry concerned with the production of literature or information – the activity of making information available for public view. In some cases, authors may be their own publishers.
Traditionally, the term refers to the distribution of printed works such as books and newspapers. With the advent of digital information systems and the Internet, the scope of publishing has expanded to include websites, blogs and the like.

As a business, publishing includes the development, marketing, production, and distribution of newspapers, magazines, books, literary works, musical works, software and other works dealing with information.

Publication is also important as a legal concept; (1) as the process of giving formal notice to the world of a significant intention, for example, to marry or enter bankruptcy, and; (2) as the essential precondition of being able to claim defamation; that is, the alleged libel must have been published.

Software publishing 

A software publisher is a publishing company in the software industry between the developer and the distributor. In some companies, two or all three of these roles may be combined (and indeed, may reside in a single person, especially in the case of shareware).

Software publishers often license software from developers with specific limitations, such as a time limit or geographical region. The terms of licensing vary enormously, and are typically secret.

Developers may use publishers to reach larger or foreign markets, or to avoid focussing on marketing. Or publishers may use developers to create software to meet a market need that the publisher has identified.

Internet Based Professions 
A YouTuber is anyone who has made their fame from creating and promoting videos on the public video-sharing site, YouTube. Many YouTube celebrities have made a profession from their site through sponsorships, advertisements, product placement, and network support.

History 

The history of mass media can be traced back to the days when dramas were performed in various ancient cultures. This was the first time when a form of media was "broadcast" to a wider audience. The first dated printed book known is the "Diamond Sutra", printed in China in 868 AD, although it is clear that books were printed earlier. Movable clay type was invented in 1041 in China. However, due to the slow spread of literacy to the masses in China, and the relatively high cost of paper there, the earliest printed mass-medium was probably European popular prints from about 1400. Although these were produced in huge numbers, very few early examples survive, and even most known to be printed before about 1600 have not survived. The term "mass media" was coined with the creation of print media, which is notable for being the first example of mass media, as we use the term today. This form of media started in Europe in the Middle Ages.

Johannes Gutenberg's invention of the printing press allowed the mass production of books to sweep the nation. He printed the first book, a Latin Bible, on a printing press with movable type in 1453. The invention of the printing press gave rise to some of the first forms of mass communication, by enabling the publication of books and newspapers on a scale much larger than was previously possible. The invention also transformed the way the world received printed materials, although books remained too expensive really to be called a mass-medium for at least a century after that. Newspapers developed from about 1612, with the first example in English in 1620; but they took until the 19th century to reach a mass-audience directly. The first high-circulation newspapers arose in London in the early 1800s, such as The Times, and were made possible by the invention of high-speed rotary steam printing presses, and railroads which allowed large-scale distribution over wide geographical areas. The increase in circulation, however, led to a decline in feedback and interactivity from the readership, making newspapers a more one-way medium.

The phrase "the media" began to be used in the 1920s. The notion of "mass media" was generally restricted to print media up until the post-Second World War, when radio, television and video were introduced. The audio-visual facilities became very popular, because they provided both information and entertainment, because the colour and sound engaged the viewers/listeners and because it was easier for the general public to passively watch TV or listen to the radio than to actively read. In recent times, the Internet become the latest and most popular mass medium. Information has become readily available through websites, and easily accessible through search engines. One can do many activities at the same time, such as playing games, listening to music and social networking, irrespective of location. Whilst other forms of mass media are restricted in the type of information they can offer, the internet comprises a large percentage of the sum of human knowledge through such things as Google Books. Modern-day mass media includes the internet, mobile phones, blogs, podcasts and RSS feeds.

During the 20th century, the growth of mass media was driven by technology, including that which allowed much duplication of material. Physical duplication technologies such as printing, record pressing and film duplication allowed the duplication of books, newspapers and movies at low prices to huge audiences. Radio and television allowed the electronic duplication of information for the first time. Mass media had the economics of linear replication: a single work could make money. An example of Riel and Neil's theory. proportional to the number of copies sold, and as volumes went up, unit costs went down, increasing profit margins further. Vast fortunes were to be made in mass media. In a democratic society, the media can serve the electorate about issues regarding government and corporate entities (see Media influence). Some consider the concentration of media ownership to be a threat to democracy.

Mergers and acquisitions 
Between 1985 and 2018, about 76,720 deals have been announced in the media industry. This sums up to an overall value of around US$5,634 billion. There have been three major waves of M&A in the mass media sector (2000, 2007 and 2015), while the most active year in terms of numbers was 2007 with around 3,808 deals. The United States is the most prominent country in media M&A with 41 of the top 50 deals having an acquirer from the United States.

The largest deal in history was the acquisition of Time Warner by AOL Inc. for US$164,746.86 million.

Influence and sociology 

Limited-effects theory, originally tested in the 1940s and 1950s, considers that because people usually choose what media to interact with based on what they already believe, media exerts a negligible influence. Class-dominant theory argues that the media reflects and projects the view of a minority elite, which controls it. Culturalist theory, which was developed in the 1980s and 1990s, combines the other two theories and claims that people interact with media to create their own meanings out of the images and messages they receive. This theory states that audience members play an active, rather than passive role in relation to mass media.

There is an article that argues 90 percent of all mass media including radio broadcast networks and programing, video news, sports entertainment, and others are owned by 6 major companies (GE, News-Corp, Disney, Viacom, Time Warner and CBS). According to Morris Creative Group, these six companies made over $200 billion in revenue in 2010. More diversity is brewing among many companies, but they have recently merged to form an elite which have the power to control the narrative of stories and alter people's beliefs. In the new media-driven age we live in, marketing has more value than ever before because of the various ways it can be implemented. Advertisements can convince citizens to purchase a specific product or have consumers avoid a particular product. The definition of what is acceptable by society can be heavily dictated by the media in regards to the amount of attention it receives.

The documentary Super Size Me describes how companies like McDonald's have been sued in the past, the plaintiffs claiming that it was the fault of their liminal and subliminal advertising that "forced" them to purchase the product. The Barbie and Ken dolls of the 1950s are sometimes cited as the main cause for the obsession in modern-day society for women to be skinny and men to be buff. After the attacks of 9/11, the media gave extensive coverage of the event and exposed Osama Bin Laden's guilt for the attack, information they were told by the authorities. This shaped the public opinion to support the war on terrorism, and later, the war on Iraq. A main concern is that due to this extreme power of the mass media, portraying inaccurate information could lead to an immense public concern. In his book The Commercialization of American Culture, Matthew P. McAllister says that "a well-developed media system, informing and teaching its citizens, helps democracy move toward its ideal state."

In 1997, J. R. Finnegan Jr. and K. Viswanath identified three main effects or functions of mass media:

The Knowledge Gap: The mass media influences knowledge gaps due to factors including "the extent to which the content is appealing, the degree to which information channels are accessible and desirable, and the amount of social conflict and diversity there is in a community".
Agenda Setting: People are influenced in how they think about issues due to the selective nature of what media groups choose for public consumption. After publicly disclosing that he had prostate cancer prior to the 2000 New York senatorial election, Rudolph Giuliani, the mayor of New York City (aided by the media) sparked a huge priority elevation of the cancer in people's consciousness. This was because news media began to report on the risks of prostate cancer, which in turn prompted a greater public awareness about the disease and the need for screening. This ability for the media to be able to change how the public thinks and behaves has occurred on other occasions. In mid-1970s when Betty Ford and Happy Rockefeller, wives of the then-President and then-Vice President, respectively, were both diagnosed with breast cancer. J. J. Davis states that "when risks are highlighted in the media, particularly in great detail, the extent of agenda setting is likely to be based on the degree to which a public sense of outrage and threat is provoked". When wanting to set an agenda, framing can be invaluably useful to a mass media organisation. Framing involves "taking a leadership role in the organisation of public discourse about an issue". The media is influenced by the desire for balance in coverage, and the resulting pressures can come from groups with particular political action and advocacy positions. Finnegan and Viswanath say, "groups, institutions and advocates compete to identify problems, to move them onto the public agenda, and to define the issues symbolically" (1997, p. 324).
Cultivation of Perceptions: The extent to which media exposure shapes audience perceptions over time is known as cultivation. Television is a common experience, especially in places like the United States, to the point where it can be described as a "homogenising agent" (S. W. Littlejohn). However, instead of being merely a result of the TV, the effect is often based on socioeconomic factors. Having a prolonged exposure to TV or movie violence might affect a viewer to the extent where they actively think community violence is a problem, or alternatively find it justifiable. The resulting belief is likely to be different depending on where people live, however.

Since the 1950s, when cinema, radio and TV began to be the primary or the only source of information for a larger and larger percentage of the population, these media began to be considered as central instruments of mass control. Up to the point that it emerged the idea that when a country has reached a high level of industrialisation, the country itself "belongs to the person who controls communications."

Mass media play a significant role in shaping public perceptions on a variety of important issues, both through the information that is dispensed through them, and through the interpretations they place upon this information. They also play a large role in shaping modern culture, by selecting and portraying a particular set of beliefs, values and traditions (an entire way of life), as reality. That is, by portraying a certain interpretation of reality, they shape reality to be more in line with that interpretation. Mass media also play a crucial role in the spread of civil unrest activities such as anti-government demonstrations, riots and general strikes. That is, the use of radio and television receivers has made the unrest influence among cities not only by the geographic location of cities, but also by proximity within the mass media distribution networks.

Racism and stereotyping 

Mass media sources, through theories like framing and agenda-setting, can affect the scope of a story as particular facts and information are highlighted (Media influence). This can directly correlate with how individuals may perceive certain groups of people, as the only media coverage a person receives can be very limited and may not reflect the whole story or situation; stories are often covered to reflect a particular perspective to target a specific demographic.

Example 
According to Stephen Balkaran, an Instructor of Political Science and African American Studies at Central Connecticut State University, mass media has played a large role in the way white Americans perceive African Americans. The media focus on African American in the contexts of crime, drug use, gang violence and other forms of anti-social behavior has resulted in a distorted and harmful public perception of African Americans.

In his 1999 article "Mass Media and Racism", Balkaran states: "The media has played a key role in perpetuating the effects of this historical oppression and in contributing to African Americans' continuing status as second-class citizens". This has resulted in an uncertainty among white Americans as to what the genuine nature of African Americans really is. Despite the resulting racial divide, the fact that these people are undeniably American has "raised doubts about the white man's value system". This means that there is a somewhat "troubling suspicion" among some Americans that their white America is tainted by the black influence. Mass media as well as propaganda tend to reinforce or introduce stereotypes to the general public.

Ethical issues and criticism 

Lack of local or specific topic focus is a common criticism of mass media. A mass news media outlet is often forced to cover national and international news due to it having to cater for and be relevant for a wide demographic. As such, it has to skip over many interesting or important local stories because they simply do not interest the large majority of their viewers. An example given by the website WiseGeek is that "the residents of a community might view their fight against development as critical, but the story would only attract the attention of the mass media if the fight became controversial or if precedents of some form were set".

The term "mass" suggests that the recipients of media products constitute a vast sea of passive, undifferentiated individuals. This is an image associated with some earlier critiques of "mass culture" and mass society which generally assumed that the development of mass communication has had a largely negative impact on modern social life, creating a kind of bland and homogeneous culture which entertains individuals without challenging them. However, interactive digital media have also been seen to challenge the read-only paradigm of earlier broadcast media.

Whilst some refer to the mass media as "opiate of the masses", others argue that is a vital aspect of human societies. By understanding mass media, one is then able to analyse and find a deeper understanding of one's population and culture. This valuable and powerful ability is one reason why the field of media studies is popular. As WiseGeek says, "watching, reading, and interacting with a nation's mass media can provide clues into how people think, especially if a diverse assortment of mass media sources are perused".

Since the 1950s, in the countries that have reached a high level of industrialisation, the mass media of cinema, radio and TV have a key role in political power.

Contemporary research demonstrates an increasing level of concentration of media ownership, with many media industries already highly concentrated and dominated by a small number of firms.

Criticism

When the study of mass media began the media was compiled of only mass media which is a very different media system than the social media empire of the 21st-century experiences. With this in mind, there are critiques that mass media no longer exists, or at least that it doesn't exist in the same form as it once did. This original form of mass media put filters on what the general public would be exposed to in regards to "news" something that is harder to do in a society of social media.

Theorist Lance Bennett explains that excluding a few major events in recent history, it is uncommon for a group big enough to be labeled a mass, to be watching the same news via the same medium of mass production. Bennett's critique of 21st-century mass media argues that today it is more common for a group of people to be receiving different news stories, from completely different sources, and thus, mass media has been re-invented. As discussed above, filters would have been applied to original mass medias when the journalists decided what would or would not be printed.

Social Media is a large contributor to the change from mass media to a new paradigm because through social media what is mass communication and what is interpersonal communication is confused. Interpersonal/niche communication is an exchange of information and information in a specific genre. In this form of communication, smaller groups of people are consuming news/information/opinions. In contrast, mass media in its original form is not restricted by genre and it is being consumed by the masses.

See also 

 Commercial broadcasting
 Concentration of media ownership
 Digital rights management
 Interpersonal communication
 Journalism
 History of journalism
 Media bias
 Media echo chamber
 Media regulation
 Media-system dependency
 Mediatization (media)
 News media
 Newspapers
 History of Newspapers
 Propaganda
 Public relations
 State media

Sources

Notes

Works cited
 
 
 Riesman, David and Gitlin, Todd and Glazer, Nathan (1950) The Lonely Crowd, preview at google books

Further reading 

 
 Bösch, Frank. Mass Media and Historical Change: Germany in International Perspective, 1400 to the Present (Berghahn, 2015). 212 pp. online review
 Cull, Nicholas John, David Culbert and David Welch, eds. Mass Persuasion: A Historical Encyclopedia, 1500 to the Present (2003) 479 pp; worldwide coverage
 Dauber, Cori Elizabeth. "The shot seen 'round the world': The impact of the images of Mogadishu on American military operations." Rhetoric & Public Affairs 4.4 (2001): 653-687 online.
 Folkerts, Jean and Dwight Teeter, eds. Voices of a Nation: A History of Mass Media in the United States (5th Edition, 2008)
 Fourie, Pieter J. Media Studies: Media History, Media and Society (2008)

 Graber, Doris A., and Johanna Dunaway. Mass media and American politics (CQ Press, 2017) 

 
 Paneth, Donald, ed. The Encyclopedia of American journalism (1983) online

 Ross, Corey. Mass Communications, Society, and Politics from the Empire to the Third Reich (Oxford University press 2010) 448 pp, on Germany
 Vaughn, Stephen L., ed. Encyclopedia of American Journalism (2007) online

In other languages
 Hacker, Violaine "Citoyenneté culturelle et politique européenne des médias: entre compétitivité et promotion des valeurs", Nations, cultures et entreprises en Europe, sous la direction de Gilles Rouet, Collection Local et Global, L’Harmattan, Paris, pp. 163–84

External links 

 The Media: Carriers of Contagious Information

 Peter Medlin, WNIJ, "Illinois Is the First State to Have High Schools Teach News Literacy," National Public Radio, August 12, 2021
 The Evolution of Global Mass Media

 
Promotion and marketing communications
Main topic articles
Communication